John Pennekamp Coral Reef State Park is a Florida State Park located on Key Largo in Florida. It includes approximately 70 nautical square miles (240 km²) of adjacent Atlantic Ocean waters. The park is approximately 25 miles in length and extends 3 miles into the Atlantic Ocean. It was the first underwater park in the United States. The park was added to the National Register of Historic Places on April 14, 1972. The primary attractions of the park are the coral reefs (such as Molasses Reef) and their associated marine life.

In Fiscal Year 2004 the park had more than a million visitors, making it the most popular park in the Florida State Parks system. The Florida Keys and the Flower Garden Banks in the Gulf of Mexico off the Texas coast are the only living coral reef formations in the continental United States.

History

Plans to designate the reefs off Key Largo for a park started in the 1930s. The state-sanctioned Everglades National Park Commission proposed a national park for the Everglades, including the reefs off Key Largo. Opposition from property owners, outdoorsmen, and Monroe County Commissioners stopped the plan. When Everglades National Park was created in 1947, the boundaries did not include Key Largo or any of the reefs.

By the late 1950s, citizens were growing concerned of the damage occurring to the reefs along the Florida Keys. Seashells, corals, sponges, sea horses, and other marine life were being hammered, chiseled, and even dynamited from the reefs to provide souvenirs for tourists. Dr. Gilbert L. Voss of the Marine Institute of Miami and John D. Pennekamp, an editor with the Miami Herald, teamed up to lead a fight to protect the reefs from further damage. Pennekamp had strong credentials for the fight. He had been active in establishing Everglades National Park, had been the first chairman of the Florida Board of Parks and Historic Memorials, and had been a consultant with the United States Fish and Wildlife Service.

These efforts led the Florida Board of Parks and Historic Memorials to designate the state-controlled reefs off Key Largo a permanent preserve. In the spring of 1960, President Dwight D. Eisenhower proclaimed the adjacent, federally controlled area of the reefs as the Key Largo Coral Reef Preserve. Florida Governor Leroy Collins later changed the name of the park to John Pennekamp Coral Reef State Park, in recognition of John Pennekamp's efforts to save marine life. A land base and access to U.S. 1 (the Overseas Highway) were acquired by purchase and donation. The park opened in 1963.* History of John Pennekamp State Park at Florida Keys History Museum

Recreational activities
The reefs may be viewed from glass-bottom boats, snorkeling, and scuba diving above the coral formations. Other activities available in the park are canoeing, kayaking, fishing, hiking, swimming and wildlife viewing. The park offers tropical hammocks and a picnic area with available grills. Full-facility and youth/group campgrounds are available.

The visitor center features a  saltwater aquarium and six smaller aquariums. The State Park also has a natural history exhibit about the park's different biological communities and ecosystems and a theater showing nature Films and videos.

Christ of the Abyss

One of the most famous sites in the Pennekamp Coral Reef State Park is the Christ of the Abyss, located near North Dry Rocks, and within the existing Key Largo management area that was incorporated into the Florida Keys National Marine Sanctuary  "on November 16, 1990". It is a popular site for scuba divers and snorkelers. The statue is located at latitude 25.123373  and longitude -80.297073.

The statue is a third casting of Il Cristo Degli Abissi in the Mediterranean Sea near Genoa, Italy, which was placed there in 1954.  The Christ of the Abyss was donated to the Underwater Society of America in 1961 by Italian scuba entrepreneur Egidio Cressi and placed in its current location in 1965.  In their current positions, the two statues face each other.

Climate
John Pennekamp has a tropical savanna climate (Köppen Aw).

Gallery

References

External links

 John Pennekamp Coral Reef State Park - official site with tour information
 John Pennekamp Coral Reef State Park at Florida State Parks
 Pennekamp top State Park in Attendance at Florida Keys Treasures

State parks of Florida
Coral reefs of Florida
Parks in Monroe County, Florida
Tourist attractions in the Florida Keys
Aquaria in Florida
Beaches of Monroe County, Florida
Landforms of Monroe County, Florida
National Register of Historic Places in Monroe County, Florida
Parks on the National Register of Historic Places in Florida
Protected areas established in 1963
Underwater diving sites in the United States
Key Largo